The 1948 National Invitation Tournament was the 1948 edition of the annual NCAA college basketball competition.

Selected teams
Below is a list of the eight teams selected for the tournament.

 Bowling Green
 DePaul
 La Salle
 NYU
 NC State
 Saint Louis
 Texas
 Western Kentucky State

Bracket
Below is the tournament bracket.

See also
 1948 NCAA basketball tournament
 1948 NAIA Basketball Tournament

References

National Invitation
National Invitation Tournament
1940s in Manhattan
Basketball in New York City
College sports in New York City
Madison Square Garden
National Invitation Tournament
National Invitation Tournament
Sports competitions in New York City
Sports in Manhattan